Karabagh (Azerbaijani:  Qarabağ) is an offshore oil and gas field in the Caspian Sea, located  east of Baku, Azerbaijan, in the northern part of Absheron archipelago. A risk service agreement (RSA) for the development of the Karabagh field was signed on 30 May 2018, between SOCAR and Equinor (Statoil). The Karabagh oilfield is located 120 kilometres east of Baku, close to the SOCAR operated Shallow Water Gunashli (SWG) field and the BP operated Azeri Chirag Gunashli (ACG) field.

History
A production sharing agreement (PSA) for exploration and development of the Karabakh field was signed on 10 November 1995. It is considered to be Azerbaijan's second major contract for development of oil fields in the Caspian Sea after ACG project. The agreement had a development and production period of up to 25 years with possible extension of 5 more years. On 13 February, 1996 the agreement was ratified by the Parliament of Azerbaijan Republic. The contract came into force on 28 February 1996. On 4 June 1996, the companies holding an interest in the project established a joint consortium and named it Caspian International Petroleum Company (CIPCO). CIPCO officially started operating in August 1996. On 26 January 1999, CIPCO announced it would cease its operations. According to the management of the consortium, the development of the field was not economically profitable at this stage. As per the president of the consortium, James Tilley, the drilling of 3 wells indicates the reservoir holds no more than 30 million tonnes of oil. CIPCO officially completed its operations on 23 February 1999. Total expenses incurred constituted nearly $100 million. In April, 2006, SOCAR announced it would be able to develop the field itself without foreign investment. Total expenditures would reach close to $200 million. According to the Vice-President of SOCAR, Khoshbakht Yusifzade, the feasibility study of two of the drilled wells revealed availability of 10 million tonnes of oil and 5-6 billion cubic meters of natural gas which draws a clear picture on recoverable reserves as a whole. 
Shareholders of CIPCO had the following stakes in Karabakh field: 
Company Interest LUKAgip JV 45%, Pennzoil 30% , LUKOIL 12.5% , SOCAR 7.5% , Agip 5%. According to the PSA agreement, the total bonus to be paid to Azerbaijan would have been $135 million. Total capital expenditures for the project were to be $1.7 billion. $1.3 billion was planned for operating costs.

See also

Azeri-Chirag-Guneshli
Baku–Tbilisi–Ceyhan pipeline
Sangachal Terminal
South Caucasus Pipeline
Baku-Supsa pipeline
Baku–Novorossiysk pipeline
Nabucco pipeline
Baku-Novo Filya gas pipeline
Nakhichevan field

References

1.	^ Jump up to: a b c d НЕФТЕГАЗОДОБЫЧА В СТРАНАХ СНГ 
2.	^ Jump up to: a b c d "Karabakh. 2nd Major Oil Contract". Azerbaijan International. Spring 1996. Retrieved 2009-12-08. 
3.	^ "Karabakh. 2nd Major Oil Contract". Azerbaijan International. Autumn 1996. Retrieved 2009-12-08. 
4.	^ "Projects". SOCAR. Archived from the original on 2009-10-29. Retrieved 2009-12-08. 
5.	^ "ГНКАР планирует вложить до $200 млн. в разработку нового месторождения в Каспийском море". Kazakhstan Today. 2006-04-29. Retrieved 2009-12-08.

External links
SOCAR information on Karabakh field project
 Президент Ильхам Алиев утвердил соглашения между SOCAR и Equinor
Contract of Century: Equinor is proud to be part of this journey from very beginning

Oil fields of Azerbaijan
Natural gas fields in Azerbaijan
Oil fields of the Soviet Union
Caspian Sea
Natural gas fields in the Soviet Union